Kentucky Route 73 (KY 73) is a  state highway in Kentucky that runs from White Road at the Kentucky-Tennessee state line southeast of Franklin to Kentucky Route 1038 northwest of South Union in rural Logan County via Franklin.

Major intersections

References

0073
0073
0073